The Falkland Islands national badminton team represents Falkland Islands in international badminton team competitions. The Falkland Islands women's team participated in the Pan American Badminton Championships in 2020 and finished in 7th place after losing the 6th place playoffs to Peru.

The Falkland Islands made their Commonwealth badminton debut in the 2010 Commonwealth Games when five representatives were selected to compete in singles and doubles.

Participation in Commonwealth Games 
Mixed team

Participation in Pan American Badminton Championships

Women's team

Participation in Island Games

Squads 

Male players
Douglas Clark
Ross Stewart
Christoper Eynon
Dominic Jaffrey

Female players
Soraye March
Vicky Chater
Louise Williams
Laura Minto
Cheryl March

References

Badminton
National badminton teams
Badminton in the Falkland Islands